The following list shows the recipients for the Country Music Association Award for Vocal Duo of the Year.

The award was first presented in 1970 as a spin-off of Vocal Group of the Year to Dolly Parton and Porter Wagoner. To date, The Judds are the only all-female duo to receive the award. Brooks & Dunn are the pair with the most wins in this category, with fourteen wins.

Recipients

Category facts
Most wins

Most nominations

Won on first nomination

 Dolly Parton and Porter Wagoner (1970)
 Waylon Jennings and Willie Nelson (1975)
 Jim Ed Brown and Helen Cornelius (1977)
 Kenny Rogers and Dottie West (1978)
 Moe Bandy and Joe Stampley (1980)
 David Frizzell and Shelly West (1981)
 Willie Nelson and Merle Haggard (1983)
 Willie Nelson and Julio Iglesias (1984)
 Anne Murray and Dave Loggins (1985)
 Dan Seals and Marie Osmond (1986)
 Ricky Skaggs and Sharon White (1987)
 The Judds (1988)
 Brooks & Dunn (1992)
 Sugarland (2007)
 Florida Georgia Line (2013)

References

Country Music Association Awards